Joshua Fien-Helfman is an American coxswain. He won a gold medal at the 2000 World Rowing Championships in Zagreb with the lightweight men's eight.

References

Year of birth missing (living people)
American male rowers
World Rowing Championships medalists for the United States
Coxswains (rowing)
Living people